was a trade union centre in Japan which operated from 1920.

Hyōgikai was founded at a conference in Kobe on May 24–27, 1925. As of late 1925, Hyōgikai had 59 affiliated trade unions and around 35,000 members. The organization was affiliated with the Pan Pacific Trade Union Secretariat. When the organization was crushed in a government crackdown in the spring of 1928, it had 11 regional councils, 82 affiliated unions and around 23,000 members.

Background 
Hyōgikai was founded as a continuation of the Reform Alliance, a group of 25 trade unions which merged out of the Eastern Local Council (a body that had separated itself from the Eastern Federation of the Sodomei trade union centre, but retained a direct affiliation to Sodomei. The Eastern Local Council had been dissolved by Sodomei, accused of being a communist plot), and on May 16, 1925 the Reform Alliance unions were expelled from Sodomei. The expelled Reform Alliance unions were joined by seven other unions in forming Hyōgikai. At the time of its foundation Hyōgikai counted with 32 trade unions and 10,778 members.

Ritsuta Noda was elected Hyōgikai chairman at the Kobe meeting. A 17-member Central Committee was formed. Noda was not a communist, but communists played a dominant role in the Central Committee. Prominent communist Central Committee members were Nabeyama, Yamamoto, Taniguchi and Mitamuro Shiro. Hyōgikai appealed to Sodomei to unite all trade unions in a single national federation, a proposal which Sodomei rejected. In response, Hyōgikai denounced the Sodomei leadership as 'bureaucratic' and 'right wing'.

Both Hyōgikai and Sodomei took part in the discussions on the formation of a joint legal proletarian party. The two sides submitted their own drafts for a party platform. On November 29, 1925, Sodomei withdrew from the party-building process, stating that it would not be part of any party which included Hyōgikai. In response Hyōgikai also pulled out of the party-building process the following day, in order not to obstruct the creation of a broad-based proletarian party. In the end, the short-lived Farmer-Labour Party was founded in December 1925. 

When the Labour-Farmer Party was founded in March 1926 (by Sodomei and others), Hyōgikai members were barred from becoming members of the party. However, this policy was relaxed after internal disagreements in the party, resulting in the withdrawal of Sodomei from the party and the establishment of a close relation between Hyōgikai and the party.

Strike actions 
Hyōgikai launched a number of lengthy strikes in 1926. In that year, around 5,000 Hyōgikai activists were detained by police and 196 were imprisoned for having organized strikes.

The third convention of Hyōgikai, held in May 1927, adopted a new platform. Focus was shifted to economic issues, on 'concrete immediate demands of the workers'. Demands raised included the struggle for 8-hour working day. Around the country, which suffered from economic crisis at the time, Hyōgikai was busy forming labour councils together with other trade unions at major factories.

The organizational structure of Hyōgikai was severely weakened by the mass arrests of March 15, 1928. An effort to rebuild the organization was initiated, but Hyōgikai and the Labour-Farmer Party were banned by the Home Ministry on April 11, 1928, accused of being linked to the communists. The Kantō Metal Workers Union made an attempt to hold a refoundation meeting of Hyōgikai on April 22, 1928, but its leaders were arrested and the meeting was never held. Communist trade unionists then changed tactics, concentrating on building local union federations. In May 1928, the Communist International did instruct the Japanese communists to focus their work on rebuilding Hyōgikai.

References

Sources 
 Beckmann, George M., and Genji Okubo. The Japanese Communist Party 1922–1945. Stanford, Calif: Stanford University Press, 1969.

National trade union centers of Japan
1925 establishments in Japan
Profintern
Trade unions established in 1925